The Mynard Road Bridge, now located near Ashland, Nebraska, is a historic  Warren truss leg bedstead bridge that was built in 1900. It was probably built by J.R. Sheeley and Company, of Lincoln, Nebraska and was listed on the National Register of Historic Places in 1992. The  Mynard Road Bridge was the longest of its engineering type remaining in the state of Nebraska when the historic inventory was done in 1992, and was still used for vehicular traffic at that time. In 2000, the bridge was relocated to be used as a pedestrian bridge at the Lee G. Simmons Conservation Park and Wildlife Safari.

References 

Road bridges on the National Register of Historic Places in Nebraska
Bridges completed in 1900
National Register of Historic Places in Cass County, Nebraska
Warren truss bridges in the United States